Andrew Kaggwa (or Andrea Kaahwa) (1856 – May 26, 1886) was a Ugandan Catholic martyr killed for his faith. He was one of many Christians put to death by King Mwanga II between 1885 and 1887. He was the king Mwanga's bandmaster-General, the Mugowa.

He was baptized on 30 April 1882 by Père Simon Lourdel M.Afr. (known as Fr. Mapera) at Nabulagala.

The day he died, he was arrested at his home and taken to the Chancellor, who ordered the executioners to cut off his arm. Kaggwa's arm was first cut off and taken to Mukasa before he was beheaded and hacked to pieces at Munyonyo. He died in the afternoon of Wednesday 26 May 1886.

Kaggwa is the patron of catechists, teachers and families. He is remembered as one of the Martyrs of Uganda's feast day.

External links
 Andrew Kaggwa
Biography of Andrew Kaggwa

1856 births
1886 deaths
19th-century Christian saints
19th-century executions by Uganda
19th-century Roman Catholic martyrs
Converts to Roman Catholicism from pagan religions
Executed Ugandan people
People executed by Buganda
Ugandan Roman Catholic saints
Canonizations by Pope Paul VI
People executed by Uganda by decapitation